Aplasmomycin is an antibiotic with antimalarial activity isolated from Streptomycete.

References

Antibiotics
Antimalarial agents
Tetrahydroxyborate esters